Ole Paus (born 1947) is a Norwegian troubadour, author, poet and actor.

Ole Paus may also refer to:

Ole Paus (shipowner) (1776–1855), Norwegian ship's captain, shipowner and land owner
Ole Paus (businessman) (1846–1931), Norwegian businessman, factory owner and banker
Ole Paus (company), a Norwegian iron and steel wholesale company, founded by the businessman
Ole Paus (general) (1910–2003), Norwegian general, diplomat and NATO official

Paus, Ole